Waterford High School is a public high school in Waterford, Connecticut, United States.

History
Waterford's first high school was constructed in 1956, and had 24 rooms. It was first occupied in January 1957 with 612 students in grades 7-9. The school became a four-year 9-12 school in 1959. The first graduating class of 161 students was in 1960.

The project to build a new high school and to re-renovate the field house began in 2010 with a budget of $72 million.

Campus
The campus has had a growth in facilities in 1956, 1959, 1962, 1968, 1982 and 2010.

The construction of a new building began in spring 2010 and the new high school officially opened for classes on Monday, April 8, 2013. The original high school was scheduled for demolition during summer 2013.

This is the second high school built in Waterford.

Athletics
Waterford High School belongs to the Eastern Connecticut Conference. East Lyme High School has traditionally been Waterford’s rival in sports. The Waterford sports teams are known as the Lancers and compete in:

American football (boys)
Baseball (boys)
State champion - 1968, 1976, 1979, 1981, 1988, 1998, 2000, 2002, 2005, 2017, 2019
Basketball (boys)
 State champion - 2012, 2018
Basketball (girls)
Cross country (boys and girls)
Fencing - foil and épée (boys and girls)
Field hockey (girls)
Golf (boys and girls)
Lacrosse (boys and girls)
Soccer (boys and girls)
Girls state champion - 2013
Softball (girls)
State champion - 1983, 2009 and 2010
Swimming (boys and girls)
Tennis (boys and girls)
Track and field (boys and girls)
Girls state champions - 1990
Volleyball (girls) 
State champions 2015
Wrestling (boys)
Cheerleading
State champions - 2010 and 2020

Notable alumni

 Valerie Azlynn (1998), actress (Sullivan & Son)
 Veronica Ballestrini, country singer
 Jeff Benedict, writer
 Tanisha Brito (1998), Miss Connecticut 2002
 Geoffrey S. Fletcher, writer
 Georgia Lee, filmmaker and writer for television
 Katie Schoepfer, professional soccer player
 Brennan Ward, mixed martial arts fighter
 Ken Liu, science fiction author

References

External links
 

Schools in New London County, Connecticut
Buildings and structures in Waterford, Connecticut
Public high schools in Connecticut